Beauvais is a French surname. Notable people with the surname include:

Armand Beauvais (1783–1843), American politician
Bernadette Beauvais (born 1949), French politician
Denis Beauvais (born 1962), Canadian artist
Garcelle Beauvais (born 1966), Haitian actress and model
Laurent Beauvais (born 1952), French politician
René Beauvais (1795–1837), Canadian carpenter and woodcarver
Robert Beauvais (1911–1982), French writer and journalist
Tammy Beauvais, Indigenous Canadian fashion designer
William Beauvais (born 1956), Canadian classical guitarist and composer

French-language surnames